Stephen Vincent Moore (11 December 1937 – 4 October 2019) was an English actor, known for his work on British television since the mid-1970s.

Biography
Moore was born in Brixton, London, the son of Mary Elisabeth (née Bruce-Anderson) and solicitor Stanley Moore. He attended the  Archbishop Tenison's grammar school in Kennington.

He was married four times. His half-brother Mark Moore performs with S'Express and his brother-in-law was the actor James Hazeldine.

Acting career
Moore was known for his appearances in Rock Follies and other TV series such as The Last Place on Earth, the children's series The Queen's Nose and the drama Mersey Beat and the British TV comedy series Solo, as well as numerous appearances on stage at the Royal National Theatre, the Royal Shakespeare Company and London's West End.  He was known for his distinctive speaking voice in a wide range of roles, notably Marvin the Paranoid Android in radio and television adaptations of The Hitchhiker's Guide to the Galaxy.

Death 
On 4 October 2019, Moore died at the age of 81.

Notable roles
Sen noci svatojánské (1959 Czech animation of A Midsummer Night's Dream ) as Francis Flute (voice)
The White Bus (1967) as Young Man
The Last Shot You Hear (1969) as Peter's Colleague
Rock Follies (1976, TV Mini-Series) as Jack, left-wing teacher and morose husband of singer Anna (The role can be seen as a prototype for Marvin).
The New Avengers (1976, TV Series) as Major Prentice
A Bridge Too Far (1977) as Major Robert Steele
State of Revolution (1977, Robert Bolt's play) as Anatoly Lunacharsky, a Communist leader
Plenty, (world premiere 1978 National Theatre London) as Raymond
Brideshead Revisited (1981, TV Mini-Series) as Cousin Jasper
Rough Cut (1980) as Chief Flight Controller
Diversion (1980) as Guy
All's Well That Ends Well (1983) as Parolles (Royal Shakespeare Company & Broadway – [Tony Nomination])
Where the Boys Are '84 (1984) as Jeff
Laughterhouse (1984) as Howard
The Last Place on Earth (1985, TV Mini-Series) as Dr. 'Bill' Wilson
The Secret Diary of Adrian Mole (1985, ITV series) as George Mole, father of Adrian Mole
Clockwise (1986) as John Jolly
The Growing Pains of Adrian Mole (1987, ITV series) as George Mole
Under Suspicion (1991) as Roscoe
Lovejoy No Strings (TV Episode 1992) as Ray MorganLove on a Branch Line (1994, TV Mini-Series) as QuirkSharpe's Sword (1995, TV Movie) as Colonel BerkelyThe Thin Blue Line (1995, TV Series BBC) as Ron, burglary victimA Bit of Fry & Laurie (1995, TV Series) as guestThe Queen's Nose (1995-2001, TV Series) as father of Melody / Harmony ParkerBrassed Off (1996) as McKenzie, the colliery managerThe Missing Postman (BBC Television Film in two parts; 1997) as RalphHarry Enfield (1997-1998, TV Series) as father of Kevin the TeenagerThe Peter Principle (1997-2000, TV Series, BBC) as Geoffrey Parkes, the Senior CashierParadise Lost in Cyberspace (1998, Radio Series, BBC) as George Smith (main character in Colin Swash's SciFi radio comedy)A Christmas Carol (1999, TV Movie) as Third BrokerClaim (2002) as Felix HalbersteinThe History Boys (2006) as Hector (West End revival of Alan Bennett's) playThe Boat That Rocked (2009) as  Prime MinisterDoctor Who (2010, Episode: "Cold Blood") as EldaneThe Hitchhiker's Guide to the Galaxy Radio Show Live (2016) as Marvin (Pre-recorded voice role)
 The voice of Marvin the Paranoid Android in radio and television adaptations of The Hitchhiker's Guide to the Galaxy. In the original radio versions, he also played a number of minor characters including Gag Halfrunt, The Ruler of the Universe, the whale and Frankie Mouse. Jim Broadbent took over the role in a 2018 adaptation of And Another Thing due to Moore's retirement.
 Reader for the original abridged audiobook versions of the Hitchhiker's Guide series, books 1–4.An Enemy of the People as Peter Stockman (for the National Theatre London and the Ahmanson Theatre Los Angeles)Oliver! The Musical as Mr Brownlow
Torvold Helmer, the overbearing husband of Nora Helmer in a 1981 rendition of Henrik Ibsen's A Doll's House in Stratford, England -S.W.E.T. Award- now known as the Laurence Olivier Award.  Also nominated for three other awards in the same season.
Professor Calculus in the BBC Radio dramatisation of The Adventures of Tintin'' series of books by Hergé

References

External links
Official website

Interview with Stephen Moore on Theatre.com
BBC radio 4
Time Out

1937 births
2019 deaths
People from Brixton
Alumni of the Royal Central School of Speech and Drama
English male television actors
English male radio actors
English male stage actors
People educated at Archbishop Tenison's Church of England School, Lambeth
Laurence Olivier Award winners
20th-century English male actors
21st-century English male actors
Male actors from London